Dodero may refer to:
 Agostino Dodero (1864–1937), an Italian entomologist
 Louis Dodero (1824–1902), a French photographer credited for inventing the Carte de visite
 John Dodero (1946), a potter working in Raku fired ceramics
Compañía Argentina de Navegación Dodero, a constituent company of Empresa Líneas Marítimas Argentinas

See also
Dodro
Dondero